Red Valley may refer to:

Places
 Red Valley, Arizona
Red Valley/Cove High School, a high school in Red Valley, Arizona
 Red Valley, Libya
Red Valley, New Jersey
 Red Valley (South Dakota)

Arts, entertainment, and media

Film
Red River Valley (1936 film), a 1936 American film directed by B. Reeves Eason 
Red River Valley (1941 film), a 1941 Western film directed by Joseph Kane
Red River Valley (1997 film), a 1997 film directed by Feng Xiaoning a

Music
Red River Valley (album), a 1977 album by American Slim Whitman. 
Red River Valley (song), an American folk song and cowboy music standard

Other media
Red Valley (podcast), a British audio drama

See also
 Red River Valley (disambiguation)
Red Hill Valley, a valley in Hamilton, Ontario, Canada
Red River Valley, a region in central North America